Conus garywilsoni is a species of sea snail, a marine gastropod mollusk in the family Conidae, the cone snails and their allies.

Like all species within the genus Conus, these snails are predatory and venomous. They are capable of "stinging" humans, therefore live ones should be handled carefully or not at all.

Description
The size of an adult shell varies between 15 mm and 21 mm.

Distribution
This marine species is endemic to Australia and can be found off the Northwest Cape, Western Australia.

References

 Lorenz, F. and Morrison, H. 2004a. A new species of Conidae (Gastropoda: Toxoglossa) from Western Australia: Conus garywilsoni sp. nov. La Conchiglia 35(309):43-46, 1 pl.
 Tucker J.K. (2009). Recent cone species database. 4 September 2009 Edition
 Tucker J.K. & Tenorio M.J. (2009) Systematic classification of Recent and fossil conoidean gastropods. Hackenheim: Conchbooks. 296 pp
 Puillandre N., Duda T.F., Meyer C., Olivera B.M. & Bouchet P. (2015). One, four or 100 genera? A new classification of the cone snails. Journal of Molluscan Studies. 81: 1–23

External links
 The Conus Biodiversity website
 Gastropods.com: Calamiconus lischkeanus lischkeanus garywilsoni (var.)
 Cone Shells – Knights of the Sea

garywilsoni
Gastropods described in 2004
Gastropods of Australia